Volker Ohling (born 17 January 1955) is a German former professional footballer who played as a forward for Werder Bremen.

References

External links
 

Living people
1955 births
German footballers
Association football forwards
Bundesliga players
2. Bundesliga players
SV Werder Bremen players
OSC Bremerhaven players
Bremer SV players
VfB Oldenburg players
20th-century German people